is a train station in the city of Toyama, Toyama Prefecture, Japan operated by the Toyama Chihō Railway.

Lines
It is also a terminal station for the Toyama Chihō Railway Fujikoshi Line

Station layout 
The station has two opposed ground-level side platforms and one single side platform serving three tracks, connected by a level crossing. The platforms are not sequentially numbered. The station is staffed.

Platforms

History
Inarimachi Station was opened on 6 December 1914.

Passenger statistics
In fiscal 2015, the station was used by 1141 passengers daily.

Adjacent stations

Surrounding area 
Japan National Route 41

See also
 List of railway stations in Japan

References

External links

 

Railway stations in Toyama Prefecture
Railway stations in Japan opened in 1914
Stations of Toyama Chihō Railway
Toyama (city)